In physics, the magnetomotive force (mmf)  is a quantity appearing in the equation for the magnetic flux in a magnetic circuit, Hopkinson's law. It is the property of certain substances or phenomena that give rise to magnetic fields:

It can be seen that the magnetomotive force plays a role in this equation analogous to the voltage  in Ohm's law: , since it is the cause of magnetic flux in a magnetic circuit:

Units
The SI unit of mmf is the ampere, the same as the unit of current (analogously the units of emf and voltage are both the volt).  Informally, and frequently, this unit is stated as the ampere-turn to avoid confusion with current.  This was the unit name in the MKS system.  Occasionally, the cgs system unit of the gilbert may also be encountered.

History
The term magnetomotive force was coined by Henry Augustus Rowland in 1880.  Rowland intended this to indicate a direct analogy with electromotive force.  The idea of a magnetic analogy to electromotive force can be found much earlier in the work of Michael Faraday (1791–1867) and it is hinted at by James Clerk Maxwell (1831–1879).  However, Rowland coined the term and was the first to make explicit an Ohm's law for magnetic circuits in 1873.

Ohm's law for magnetic circuits is sometimes referred to as Hopkinson's law rather than Rowland's law as some authors attribute the law to John Hopkinson instead of Rowland.  According to a review of magnetic circuit analysis methods this is an incorrect attribution originating from an 1885 paper by Hopkinson.  Furthermore, Hopkinson actually cites Rowland's 1873 paper in this work.

References

Bibliography

Cited sources
 Hon, Giora; Goldstein, Bernard R, "Symmetry and asymmetry in electrodynamics from Rowland to Einstein", Studies in History and Philosophy of Modern Physics, vol. 37, iss. 4, pp. 635–660, Elsevier December 2006.
 Hopkinson, John, "Magnetisation of iron", Philosophical Transactions of the Royal Society, vol. 176, pp. 455–469, 1885.
 Lambert, Mathieu; Mahseredjian, Jean; Martínez-Duró, Manuel; Sirois, Frédéric, "Magnetic circuits within electric circuits: critical review of existing methods and new mutator implementations", IEEE Transactions on Power Delivery, vol. 30, iss. 6, pp. 2427–2434, December 2015.
 Rowland, Henry A, "On magnetic permeability and the maximum magnetism of iron, steel, and nickel", Philosophical Magazine, series 4, vol. 46, no. 304, pp. 140–159, August 1873.
 Rowland, Henry A, "On the general equations of electro-magnetic action, with application to a new theory of magnetic attractions, and to the theory of the magnetic rotation of the plane of polarization of light" (part 2), American Journal of Mathematics, vol. 3, nos. 1–2, pp. 89–113, March 1880.
 Schmidt, Robert Munnig; Schitter, Georg, "Electromechanical actuators", ch. 5 in Schmidt, Robert Munnig; Schitter, Georg; Rankers, Adrian; van Eijk, Jan, The Design of High Performance Mechatronics, IOS Press, 2014 .
 Thompson, Silvanus Phillips, The Electromagnet and Electromagnetic Mechanism, Cambridge University Press, 2011 (first published 1891) .
 Smith, R.J. (1966), Circuits, Devices and Systems, Chapter 15, Wiley International Edition, New York.  Library of Congress Catalog Card No. 66-17612
 Waygood, Adrian, An Introduction to Electrical Science, Routledge, 2013 .

General references
 The Penguin Dictionary of Physics, 1977, 
 A Textbook of Electrical Technology, 2008, 

Magnetism
Physical quantities

it:Forza magnetomotrice